The football tournament of the 1948 Summer Olympics was won by Sweden. This remains Sweden's only international title at a senior male football level and was the first international appearance of the trio that would later be known as Gre-No-Li dominating the Italian league at A.C. Milan in the 1950s.

It was the first international football tournament ever to be broadcast on television, with the semi-finals, final and bronze medal play-off all being broadcast live in full on the BBC Television Service.

Venues

Squads

Final tournament

The tournament began on 26 July 1948 with a preliminary round of two matches: Luxembourg defeating Afghanistan 6–0 and the Netherlands beating Ireland 3–1, with Faas Wilkes scoring two goals for the Dutch. In the first round, which began five days later, the Netherlands played Great Britain at Highbury, Britain prevailing 4–3 after extra time. In goal for Britain was Ronnie Simpson, who would go on to become the oldest Scottish international debutant in history and one of the Lisbon Lions. Yugoslavia (victors over Luxembourg) and Sweden (3–0 winners against Austria) also went through. France eliminated India.

Sweden's style of play at White Hart Lane attracted much attention. Their forward line contained three exceptional players; one of them Gunnar Gren scored a brace in an easy win. There were two goals, as well, for future FIFA World Cup star Željko Čajkovski in Yugoslavia's 6–1 rout of Luxembourg, although they were behind at half-time. South Korea beat Mexico 5–3. Walter Bahr, Ed Souza, Charlie Colombo and John Souza were part of the United States team that lost 9–0 to Italy, conceding five goals at the end of the match when they were down to nine men. They would later participate in the 1950 FIFA World Cup and beat the favourites England in one of the greatest upsets in football history.

In the quarter-finals, Sweden defeated both the South Koreans and the Danes in the semi-final. In the second semi-final, Great Britain played Yugoslavia at Wembley Stadium, going out by three goals to one. 3–1 was also the score in the final in favour of Sweden over Yugoslavia.

Preliminary round

First round

Quarter-finals

Semi-finals

Bronze medal match

Gold medal match

Bracket

Medalists

Statistics

Goalscorers
7 goals

  John Hansen (Denmark)
  Gunnar Nordahl (Sweden)

5 goals

  Francesco Pernigo (Italy)
  Henry Carlsson (Sweden)
  Kjell Rosén (Sweden)

4 goals

  Stjepan Bobek (Yugoslavia)

3 goals

  Bob Hardisty (Great Britain)
  Emidio Cavigioli (Italy)
  Servaas Wilkes (Netherlands)
  Gunnar Gren (Sweden)
  Željko Čajkovski (Yugoslavia)

2 goals

  Karl Aage Hansen (Denmark)
  Johannes Pløger (Denmark)
  Emilio Caprile (Italy)
  Julien Gales (Luxembourg)
  Marcel Paulus (Luxembourg)
  Fernand Schammel (Luxembourg)
  Bram Appel (Netherlands)
  Chung Kook-chin (South Korea)
  Nils Liedholm (Sweden)
  Gündüz Kılıç (Turkey)
  Rajko Mitić (Yugoslavia)
  Franjo Wölfl (Yugoslavia)

1 goal

  Karl Aage Præst (Denmark)
  Holger Seebach (Denmark)
  Jørgen Leschly Sørensen (Denmark)
  El Din El Guindy (Egypt)
  René Courbin (France)
  René Persillon (France)
  Andy Aitken (Great Britain)
  Bill Amor (Great Britain)
  Frank Donovan (Great Britain)
  Dennis Kelleher (Great Britain)
  Douglas McBain (Great Britain)
  Harry McIlvenny (Great Britain)
  Sarangapani Raman (India)
  Bobby Smith (Ireland)
  Adone Stellin (Italy)
  Angelo Turconi (Italy)
  Nicolas Kettel (Luxembourg)
  Raúl Cárdenas (Mexico)
  Antonio Figueroa (Mexico)
  José Ruiz (Mexico)
  Andre Roosenburg (Netherlands)
  Bai Chon-go (South Korea)
  Chung Nam-sik (South Korea)
  Choi Song-gon (South Korea)
  Şükrü Gülesin (Turkey)
  Lefter Küçükandonyadis (Turkey)
  Huseyin Saygun (Turkey)
  Prvoslav Mihajlović (Yugoslavia)
  Branko Stanković (Yugoslavia)

References

Sources

External links

 
1948
Football
1948 in association football
1948
1948
1948–49 in English football